Sphenarches is a genus of moths in the family Pterophoridae. Species in this genus are distributed in regions with pantropical climates, and are also found in Japan and southern Canada. Host plants for the genus are Dolichos lablab, Lagenaria leucantha clavata, and L. leucantha gourda.

Species
 Sphenarches anisodactylus (syn: Sphenarches synophrys (type))
 Sphenarches bilineatus Yano, 1963
 Sphenarches bifurcatus
 Sphenarches caffer (Zeller, 1852)
 Sphenarches cafferoides Gibeaux, 1996
 Sphenarches nanellus
 Sphenarches ontario (McDunnough, 1927)
 Sphenarches zanclistes (Meyrick, 1905)

Species of doubtful validity
Sphenarches languidus was originally described as Oxyptilus languidus, discovered in Colombia by Felder and Rogenhofer in 1875. The species's validity is uncertain; it may be a synonym of Sphenarches nanellus. The type specimen of this species is in poor condition, and more information has not been found. Contemporary knowledge is not able to differentiate between the two species.

References

Platyptiliini
Pantropical fauna
Moth genera
Taxa named by Edward Meyrick